The 1905 Tour de France was the 3rd edition of Tour de France, one of cycling's Grand Tours. The Tour began in Paris on 9 July and Stage 6 occurred on 20 July with a flat stage to Toulouse. The race finished in Paris on 29 July.

Stage 1
9 July 1905 — Paris to Nancy,

Stage 2
11 July 1905 — Nancy to Besançon,

Stage 3
14 July 1905 — Besançon to Grenoble,

Stage 4
16 July 1905 — Grenoble to Toulon,

Stage 5
18 July 1905 — Toulon to Nîmes,

Stage 6
20 July 1905 — Nîmes to Toulouse,

References

1905 Tour de France
Tour de France stages